Skip Bifferty is the only album by Skip Bifferty.

Track listing
Side 1
"Money Man" (Bell, Turnbull, Gallagher, Gibson, Jackman)
"Jeremy Carabine" (Bell, Turnbull, Gibson)
"When She Comes to Stay" (Turnbull, Bell)
"Guru" (Turnbull, Gibson)
"Come Around" (Bell, Gallagher, Turnbull)
"Time Track" (Bell, Turnbull, Gibson)
"Gas Board Under Dog (Part 1)" (Turnbull, Gallagher)
Side 2
"Inside the Secret" (Bell)
"Orange Lace" (Bell, Turnbull)
"Planting Bad Seeds" (Smith, Gallagher, Turnbull, Bell)
"Yours for at Least 24" (Bell, Turnbull, Gallagher, Gibson)
"Follow the Path of the Stars" (Smith, Bell, Gallagher)
"Prince of Germany the First" (Gibson, Turnbull)
"Clearway 51" (Bell, Gibson, Gallagher)

Personnel
Skip Bifferty
Graham Bell - vocals
John Turnbull - guitar, vocals
Colin Gibson - bass
Mick Gallagher - keyboards
Tommy Jackman - drums
Technical
Producer: Vic Smith (later also producer of The Jam)
Cover Paintings: R. Wagner

References

1968 debut albums
RCA Records albums